Blair Inskip Swannell (20 August 1875 – 25 April 1915) was an English-born international rugby union forward who played club rugby for Northampton, and internationally for the British Isles and later Australia. He was invited to tour with the British Isles on their 1899 tour of Australia and then their 1904 tour of Australia and New Zealand. He played a total of seven Test matches on these tours, and scored one Test try – against Australia during the 1904 tour. After settling in Australia, Swannell played a single game for his new home when they faced New Zealand. He was viewed as a violent player, and this made his unpopular with other players. Former Australian captain Herbert Moran said of him that "... his conception of rugby was one of trained violence".

During the Second Boer War, Swannell served in the British Army in South Africa, rising to the rank of lieutenant.

During the First World War he transferred from the Australian Army to the Australian Imperial Force in September 1914; and, retaining his rank of captain, he served with the 1st Battalion. Promoted to major on 1 January 1915, he was killed on 25 April 1915 while taking part in the Landing at Anzac Cove, during the first day of the Gallipoli Campaign.

Personal history
Swannell was born in Weston Underwood, Buckinghamshire on 20 August 1875 to William and Charlotte Swannell, and was the third child of at least five siblings. His father was a farmer, who ran a  farm which employed 17 adults and children. He was home schooled as an infant before beginning his formal education at Repton School. After leaving school he attended the Thames Nautical Training College where he gained qualifications as a second mate. He remained single throughout his life.

In 1897 he made his first visit to Australia, as a mate on a schooner. On his return to Britain, Swannell joined the British Army and served in South Africa during the Second Boer War, where he was commissioned as a lieutenant in the 35th Battalion (Buckinghamshire) Imperial Yeomanry on 20 January 1902. He returned to the UK with his battalion on the SS Orotava in December 1902, and retained the rank of honorary lieutenant when he resigned his commission on 3 February 1903. It was reported that during his time in South Africa, he was personally recommended on the field for a commission by General Lord Methuen.

Swannell was a keen self-promoter, claiming a number of exploits that were so abounding, that his adventures were "too numerous to be recorded". These claims included: fighting among the insurrectionists in Uruguay, to have hunted seal down the South American coast and around Cape Horn as well as Labrador, and to have played rugby in France, Germany, South Africa, India and North and South America. Many of these claims are unsubstantiated. One claim that is problematic, made by the Fielding Star newspaper in 1909, was that he took part in the Cape Frontier war. This cannot be a reference to the Xhosa Wars as the last of that series of wars ended in 1879, when he was merely the age of four. An article from 1925, claimed he represented Wales and Argentina.

After touring Australia with the British Isles team for the second time in 1904, he settled in Sydney. A keen all-round sportsman he coached not only rugby but also hockey, was vice-president of the Sydney Swimming Club, and training senior military cadets for surf life-saving examinations. He also joined the Australian Militia, and by 1914 had reached the rank of captain and had passed the promotion exams for the rank of major.

Rugby career
Swannell played as a forward, and in his last Test specifically at number eight. He was an unconventional and hard rugby player, known for his violent play. He would turn up for training in unwashed kit, and wore the same pair of breeches for every game, again unwashed. His poor personal hygiene and overly violent playing style, made him an unpopular character in the eyes of other players.

Swannell first came to note as a rugby player when he represented English club team Northampton. It was while with Northampton that Swannell was invited to tour with Matthew Mullineux's British Isles team, on their 1899 tour of Australia. Swanell played in 17 matches of the tour including three of the four Tests against the Australian national team, missing only the opening defeat. Swannell scored in only one game on the tour, a try in a win over the New South Wales Waratahs on 29 July 1899.

Swannell returned to Britain with the touring team, and was reselected for the 1904 tour, this time taking in Australia and New Zealand. Swannell played in 15 games, including all four Test Matches, three against Australia and the final Test against New Zealand. In the third Test, Swannell scored his first and only international points, a try against Australia in Sydney. The British Isles were victorious over the Australians, but lost the New Zealand match, this was the first international game that Swannell had been on the losing side. In the New Zealand clash, Swannell's violent playing style, was targeted by countering with equally rough play. He left the field at the end of the match with two black eyes, and bleeding, but with his spirit undaunted.

When the touring British team returned home after the 1904 campaign, Swannell along with team-mates David Bedell-Sivright, and Dr. Sidney Crowther decided to remain in Australia, to begin new lives, although Crowther later returned to England. Swannell joined club team Northern Suburbs, based in Sydney. In 1905 he was selected to play for the Australian national team, even though he had already faced them as an opponent on six occasions. The match was against New Zealand, and was the first overseas tour the Australians had undertaken; Australia lost 14–3. Wallaby captain Herbert Moran didn't mince words when speaking of Swannell in Viewless Winds saying "Swannell was, for a number of years, a bad influence in Sydney football...his conception of rugby was one of trained violence"

With his playing career behind him, Swannell continued his involvement with the sport by coaching at youth and school level, namely at St Joseph's College where he coached the team to a number of championships. He was an advocate for team training and in particular for forwards to rehearse scrummaging and break-down techniques. He argued that the forwards won or lost the game. In 1909, he became Secretary of the Metropolitan Rugby Union, and in 1910 the club raised his salary from £200 to £250. Financial stress on the club lead him to resign in 1911 to save expense, but he continued in an 'honorary position'. He also served as a referee from 1911 to 1914, earning praise for his ability to control the game.

While in Australia, Swannell was often approached by the sporting press for his opinion on rugby matters. Particularly on clashes between British and Antipodean teams, including the 1905 New Zealand tour. He was vocal in his support for maintaining the amateur nature of rugby, but did not side with Bedell-Sivright in denying that a stipend had been paid during the 1904 tour. In 1908 he was also hired to write a series of articles for the Star on the topic of forward play, and scrummaging.

Gallipoli and death

Already in the Australian Army, with the outbreak of the First World War, Swannell transferred to the Australian Imperial Force, retained his rank of captain, and was posted to Egypt, travelling on the SS Afric on 18 October 1914, arriving in Egypt on 3 December 1914.

Although his promotion to the rank of major was effective 1 January 1915, his elevation in rank was not formally gazetted until 24 April 1915.

In April 1915, Swannell was part of the Australian forces that took part in the Gallipoli Campaign — an attempt to capture the Ottoman city of Istanbul.

Swannell and his men from D Company of the 1st Battalion, transported on the troopship SS Minewasska, landed at the peninsula on 25 April, and were immediately involved in heavy fighting after being diverted to reinforce the 12th Battalion. In the buildup to the assault on the hill known as Baby 700, Swannell and his men were pinned down under heavy enemy fire. While attempting to show his men the best method of aiming their rifles, he was shot in the head and killed by a sniper.

He is commemorated at Baby 700 Cemetery in Gallipoli, and also with a plaque on the walls at Weston-Underwood church in Buckinghamshire.

In April 2015 for the centenary of the Gallipoli landings, fellow Northampton Saints and England rugby international Ben Foden, was featured narrating tributes to Swannell on both BBC TV regional news and Radio Northampton. Foden penned and read the following message at the grave of Blair Swannell in Turkey:

From the turf of Franklin's Gardens where you stood,
To the shores of Gallipoli where you fell,
A truer Saintsman I know not,
Forever bleeding green, black and gold.
Rest in peace

See also
 List of Australian military personnel killed at Anzac Cove on 25 April 1915
 List of international rugby union players killed in action during the First World War

Footnotes

References

 Supplement to the Government Gazette of the State of New South Wales, No.45, (Friday, 7 April 1911), p.2027: Appointment of "Swannell, Blair Inskip" as Justice of the Peace  — effective 7 April 1911.
 Military Forces of the Commonwealth: Commonwealth Military Cadet Corps: New South Wales: Senior Cadets, Commonwealth of Australia Gazette, No.70, (Saturday, 16 September 1911), p.1914: Provisional appointment of Lieutenant Blair Inskip Swannell – effective 4 September 1911.
 Military Forces of the Commonwealth: Commonwealth Military Cadet Corps: 2st Military District: Senior Cadets, Commonwealth of Australia Gazette, No.47, (Saturday, 20 July 1912), p.1300: Confirmation of the provisional appointment of Lieutenant Blair Inskip Swannell – effective 27 June 1912.
 Military Forces of the Commonwealth, Commonwealth of Australia Gazette, No.80, (Saturday, 21 December 1912), p.2667: Temporary appointment of Lieutenant Blair Inskip Swannell as Area Officer (Darlington), seconded from Senior Cadets – effective 16 December 1912.
 Military Forces of the Commonwealth: Commonwealth Military Cadet Corps: 2nd Military District: Senior Cadets, Commonwealth of Australia Gazette, No.14, (Saturday, 22 February 1913), p.467: Promotion of Lieutenant Blair Inskip Swannell to Captain – effective 10 February 1913.
 Australian Imperial Force: Appointments: 1st Infantry Brigade, Commonwealth of Australia Gazette, No.71, (Saturday, 12 September 1914), p.2164: Captain Blair Inskip Swannell (Senior Cadets) seconded for service with the Australian Imperial Force (1st Battalion, 1st Infantry Brigade) — effective 3 September 1914.
 Australian Imperial Force: Appointments, Promotions, etc.: Promotions, Commonwealth of Australia Gazette, No.32, (Saturday, 24 April 1915), p.735: Promotion of Captain Blair Inskip Swannell to Major – effective 1 January 1915.
 Roll of Honour: Blair Inskip Swannell, Australian War Memorial.
 World War I Service Record: Blair Inskip Swannell, National Archives of Australia.
 
 Howell, Max (2005) Born to Lead – Wallaby Test Captains, Celebrity Books, Auckland NZ
 McCrey, N. Into Touch: Rugby Internationals Killed in the Great War, Pen & Sword Military, (Barnsley), 2014.
 Moran, Paddy Viewless Winds – the recollections and digressions of an Australian surgeon; P Davies Pub., London (1939)

1875 births
1915 deaths
Military personnel from Buckinghamshire
English rugby union players
Rugby union flankers
People from the Borough of Milton Keynes
British & Irish Lions rugby union players from England
Northampton Saints players
Australian rugby union players
Australian military personnel killed in World War I
British Army personnel of the Second Boer War
Australian Army officers
People educated at Repton School
Australia international rugby union players
Imperial Yeomanry officers
English emigrants to Australia
Burials at Baby 700 Commonwealth War Graves Commission Cemetery
Rugby union players from Buckinghamshire
Rugby union number eights